Jean Gourguet (5 December 1902 - 13 March 1994) was a French film director, screenwriter and film producer.

Filmography

Director 

 1928 : Rayon de soleil 
 1929 : L'Escale
 1934 : L'Affaire Coquelet
 1938 : Jeannette Bourgogne
 1942 : Le Moussaillon
 1943 : Malaria
 1946 : Her Final Role
 1949 : Les Orphelins de Saint-Vaast
 1950 : Zone frontière
 1951 : Trafic sur les dunes
 1952 :  A Mother's Secret 
 1952 : Une enfant dans la tourmente
 1953 : Maternité clandestine
 1954 : La Fille perdue
 1955 : La Cage aux souris
 1955 : Les Premiers Outrages
 1956 : Les Promesses dangereuses
 1957 : Isabelle Is Afraid of Men 
 1958 : La P... sentimentale
 1960 : Les Frangines
 1961 : La Traversée de la Loire

External links 
 Jean Gourguet on data.bnf.fr

 Site personnel de Jean Gourguet
 Jean Gourguet sur lesgensducinema.com
 Jean Gourguet sur cineressources.net

French film directors
20th-century French screenwriters
French film producers
People from Sète
1902 births
1994 deaths